Loïc Lantoine is a French singer and songwriter born in Armentières, Nord-Pas-de-Calais, France. He wrote songs for Jehan in Les ailes de Jehan and for Allain Leprest and in 2000 for the show Ne nous quittons plus. He also became part of formations La Rue Kétanou, he was a founder of Mon côté punk.

He was part of a duo with François Pierron, and then a quartet by including Eric Philippon and Joseph Doherty, and finally a quintet with the addition of Thomas Fiancette all under the name Les Loïc Lantoine.

In April 2013, he released his solo album J’ai changé.

Discography

Albums
Solo

as part of Les Loïc Lantoine
2004: Badaboum
2006: Tout est calme
2008: A l'attaque

as part of Mon côté punk
2004: J'y peux rien (EP)
2005: Mon côté punk

Collective albums 
2010: Les étrangers familiers (Loic Lantoine & Éric Lareine)
2010: Ronchonchons et compagnie (Loic Lantoine, Juliette & Laurent Deschamps - written by Alexis HK & Liz Cherhal)

References

External links
Facebook
MySpace

People from Armentières
French male singers
French songwriters
Male songwriters
Living people
Year of birth missing (living people)